Fire and Gasoline is the second solo album released in 1989 by British musician Steve Jones, formerly of the Sex Pistols. The album featured Axl Rose of Guns N' Roses on the song "I Did U No Wrong" and the lyrics of Nikki Sixx of Mötley Crüe on "We're Not Saints". The album was co-produced by Ian Astbury of The Cult, who also sings backing vocals on the album, while Cult guitarist Billy Duffy plays guitar on the song "Get Ready" and then-current Cult drummer Mickey Curry plays throughout the album.

Reception
In 2005, Fire and Gasoline was ranked number 460 in Rock Hard magazine's book The 500 Greatest Rock & Metal Albums of All Time.

Track listing
All tracks composed by Steve Jones; except where indicated
    
 "Freedom Fighter"   
 "We're Not Saints" (Steve Jones, Terry Nails, Nikki Sixx)
 "God in Louisiana" (Steve Jones, Tonio K)
 "Fire and Gasoline"
 "Trouble Maker" (Angry Anderson, Steve Jones, Gordon Leach, Dallas "Digger" Royal, Peter Wells, Terry Nails)
 "I Did U No Wrong" (Jones, Glen Matlock, Johnny Rotten, Paul Cook)
 "Get Ready" (Ian Astbury, Steve Jones)
 "Gimme Love"
 "Wild Wheels"
 "Hold On"
 "Leave Your Shoes On" (Ian Astbury, Steve Jones)
 "Suffragette City" (David Bowie)

Personnel
Steve Jones - vocals, guitar, background vocals
Billy Duffy - guitar solo on "Get Ready"
Terry Nails - bass, backing vocals
Ian Astbury - backing vocals, tambourine , vocals on "I Did U No Wrong"
Mickey Curry - drums
Axl Rose - vocals on "I Did U No Wrong"
Technical
Mark Dearnley - engineer, mixing
Ron St. Germain - mixing on "We're No Saints"
Jeff Adamoff - art direction
Jeff Katz - photography

References

External links
[ AllMusic]
last.fm

1989 albums
Steve Jones (musician) albums
Heavy metal albums by English artists
MCA Records albums